Tommy Sylvestre (born 31 August 1946) is a former Togo international football goalkeeper.

Career
Born in Kinshasa, Sylvestre moved to Lome and began playing club football for local side Étoile Filante de Lomé. He enjoyed success with Étoile Filante, helping the club reach the finals of the 1968 African Cup of Champions Clubs. In 1974, Sylvestre moved to Côte d'Ivoire to finish his career with Stade d'Abidjan and Stella Club d'Adjamé.

Sylvestre made several appearances for the senior Togo national football team. He made a penalty save against Ghana that helped Togo reach its first 1972 African Cup of Nations finals, where he would be named the best goalkeeper in the tournament.

In 2006, he was selected by CAF as one of the best 200 African football players of the last 50 years.

References

External links
TOGO-foot interview with Tommy Sylvestre

1946 births
Living people
Footballers from Kinshasa
Togolese footballers
Togolese expatriate footballers
Togo international footballers
1972 African Cup of Nations players
Étoile Filante du Togo players
Stade d'Abidjan players
Stella Club d'Adjamé players
Expatriate footballers in Ivory Coast
Togolese expatriate sportspeople in Ivory Coast
Association football goalkeepers
21st-century Togolese people